Michael or Mike Payne may refer to:
Michael Payne (cartoonist), English cartoonist and illustrator
Michael Payne (executive), former director of the International Olympic Committee
Michael Payne (interior designer)
Michael "Clip" Payne (born 1958), Parliament-Funkadelic keyboardist
Mike Payne (physicist), professor at the University of Cambridge
Michael Gustavius Payne (born 1969), Welsh painter
Michael H. Payne (born 1965), science fiction writer
Mike Payne (baseball) (1961–2002), Major League Baseball pitcher.
Michael Payne (swimmer), English swimmer

See also
Michael Paine (1928–2018), American engineer